Thomas Bloodgood (died 1843) was a president of City National Bank.

Bloodgood was born in Flushing, New York, and was a member of the Bloodgood family dating back to Dutch ownership of New York. He was also a wine merchant at the Fulton Market and owned a nursery in Flushing.

References 

1843 deaths
Citigroup people
American bank presidents
Year of birth missing